The Beijing Municipal Administration & Communication Card, more commonly known as the Yikatong (literally One-card pass), is a stored-value contactless smart card used in Beijing, China, for public transportation and related uses. It is similar to Hong Kong's Octopus card, Singapore's CEPAS, The OMNY Card in New York City, United States, or the Oyster Card used by Transport for London in London, England.

History 
After smart card pilot projects proved successful, Yikatong was introduced at the end of 2003 on Beijing subway Line 13 and certain bus routes. Initially, the card was not widely adopted by passengers because of its limited usefulness, the relatively high deposit, and its lack of availability. Beginning on 10 May 2006, Beijing's entire subway system and all Beijing buses began to accept the card, which replaced the traditional paper monthly passes. At the same time, the purchase and recharging of cards became possible at many more commercial outlets. While some passengers initially complained about long queues at bus stops, the system was adopted by increasing numbers of people. On 16 May 2006, 4,471,800 transactions were made using Yikatong.

The system was introduced on some taxis in 2006 and, from the beginning of August 2008, all Beijing taxis were required to accept Yikatong for fare payment. The system was expected to be further expanded for payments of parking fees and expressway tolls.

By the end of 2011, 41.76 million Yikatong cards had been issued.

Cost 
The card can be bought against a deposit of CNY 20, and can be bought at most ticket counters at Beijing Subway stations and some bus stations. The cards can be refilled in units of CNY 10 at these counters, and by units of CNY 20, 50, or 100 in Beijing Subway ticket machines. The deposit is used to cover non-sufficient funds for a single trip, and can be refunded when the card is returned. After the last use of the card, it will remain its value for three years, until the month before the one travelled in.

When paying by the card, passengers get 50% off the normal bus fare within the municipality, and 20% off outside the municipality, except on some special purpose routes. However, paying by Yikatong card gives no discount on subway or taxi fares. More and more, by travelling on buses, one must check in and check out, just like on the metro system (October 2015), except on special routes with flat fare.

The previous monthly passes have been canceled. Instead, 3 kinds of short-term passes were introduced on 2 February 2007 for tourists. There are 3-day, 7-day and 14-day passes for buses only, which cost CNY 10, CNY 20, and CNY 40 respectively, with usage limitations as 18, 42, and 90 respectively. Those cards also requires CNY 20 deposit which will be refunded. No refills available for those short term cards. No photo is required, and cards can be transferred.

The card can also be used at selected cinema, supermarkets and restaurants, such as cinemas of New Film Association, Walmart or Kentucky Fried Chicken franchises. It can be used to pay admission to the Wofo Temple. Most of the gymnasiums accept the service as well.

Beijing's bicycle sharing system, launched in 2012, uses the card as well, although it must first be activated for the service at authorized locations.

References

External links 

 Beijing Municipal Administration and Communications Card Official site

Transport in Beijing
Fare collection systems in China
Contactless smart cards